Zhou Yang (born 16 May 1988 in Chengdu, Sichuan) is a female Chinese pole vaulter.

She won the 2006 World Junior Championships and finished eighth at the 2007 Summer Universiade. She will represent her country at the 2008 Summer Olympics.

Her personal best jump is 4.45 metres, achieved in June 2008 in Suzhou.

References
 
 Team China 2008

1988 births
Living people
Athletes (track and field) at the 2008 Summer Olympics
Chinese female pole vaulters
Olympic athletes of China
Sportspeople from Chengdu
Athletes from Sichuan